Tarentola pastoria is a species of gecko, a lizard in the family Phyllodactylidae. It is native to Guinea and adjacent northern Sierra Leone.

References

Further reading
Trape, Jean-François; Trape, Sébastien; Chirio, Laurent (2012). Lézards, crocodiles et tortues d'Afrique occidentale et du Sahara. Paris: IRD Orstom. 503 pp. . (Tarentola pastoria, new species). (in French).

Tarentola
Geckos of Africa
Reptiles of West Africa
Fauna of Guinea
Fauna of Sierra Leone
Reptiles described in 2012